Hornby is a village and former civil parish  from Lancaster, now in the parish of Hornby-with-Farleton, in the Lancaster district, in the county of Lancashire, England. The village is on the A683 and at the confluence of the River Wenning and Lune In 2011 the built up area had a population of 468. In 1881 the parish had a population of 358.

History 
Hornby was recorded in the Domesday Book as Hornebi. Hornby was a township and chapelry in Melling parish. From 1866 Hornby was a civil parish in its own right until it was merged with Farleton on 24 March 1887 to form "Hornby-with-Farleton".

Amenities 

Hornby has a church called St Margaret's Church on Main Street, with its octagonal tower a county house called Hornby Castle which overlooks the village. It was started in the 13th century as a replacement for Castle Stede. The tower is 16th-century but the rest was constructed during the 18th and 19th centuries. Despite the castle now being divided into flats, it is still one of the most recognisable points of the village. Hornby Castle and grounds are private, although the gardens are open two weekends each year in February for snowdrops and May with a small entrance fee. There is no access to castle buildings, but most of the grounds are available to walk round freely on these dates. The gardens also feature a walled garden with plants for sale., a primary school called Hornby St. Margaret's C of E Primary School on Main Street and a village institute on Main Street. A mile to the north of the castle are the earthwork remains of Castle Stede, a motte-and-bailey castle dating from the eleventh or twelfth century.

Hornby formerly had a high school called Hornby High School that closed in August 2009.

References

External links 

 Official website

Villages in Lancashire
Former civil parishes in Lancashire
Geography of the City of Lancaster